Altham  is a civil parish in Hyndburn, Lancashire, England.  It contains five buildings that are recorded in the National Heritage List for England as designated listed buildings. Of these, one is listed at Grade II*, the middle grade, and the others are at Grade II.  The listed buildings consists of a church, houses and cottages, a bridge over the Leeds and Liverpool Canal, and a former corn mill.

Key

Buildings

References

Citations

Sources

Lists of listed buildings in Lancashire
Buildings and structures in Hyndburn